Sassi's olive greenbul (Phyllastrephus lorenzi) is a songbird in the bulbul family, Pycnonotidae.

It is found in north-eastern and eastern Democratic Republic of the Congo and Uganda.  Its natural habitats are subtropical or tropical moist lowland forest and subtropical or tropical moist montane forest. While it was formerly assessed as Near threatened and its population is decreasing due to habitat loss, it is now considered a species of Least concern by the IUCN.

Taxonomy and systematics
Formerly, some authorities considered Sassi's olive greenbul to be a subspecies of the icterine greenbul. The scientific name commemorates the Austrian zoologist Ludwig Lorenz von Liburnau. Alternate names for Sassi's olive greenbul include Lorenz's greenbul, Sassi's bulbul and Sassi's greenbul.

References

Sassi's olive greenbul
Birds of Sub-Saharan Africa
Birds of Central Africa
Sassi's olive greenbul
Taxonomy articles created by Polbot